Just the Facts and Pass the Bucket is an album by Henry Threadgill released on the About Time label in 1983.  The album features six of Threadgill's compositions performed by Threadgill with Craig Harris, Olu Dara, Fred Hopkins, Diedre Murray, Pheeroan akLaff and John Betsch.

Reception
The Allmusic review by Arwulf Arwulf states, "Musically, this album is a marvel of collective creativity. Threadgill's approach to his art is comparable to that of Muhal Richard Abrams and other cardinal members of the Association for the Advancement of Creative Musicians".

Track listing
All compositions by Henry Threadgill
 "Gateway" - 9:08  
 "Cover" - 7:09  
 "Black Blues" - 4:32  
 "Just the Facts and Pass the Bucket" - 4:25  
 "Cremation" - 6:04  
 "A Man Called Trinity Deliverance" - 8:34  
Recorded at Right Track Studios, New York City on March 22 & 23, 1983

Personnel
Henry Threadgill - alto saxophone, baritone saxophone, clarinet, flute
Olu Dara - cornet
Craig Harris - trombone
Diedre Murray - cello
Fred Hopkins - bass
John Betsch - percussion
Pheeroan akLaff - percussion

References

1983 albums
Henry Threadgill albums